Luciano Orodisio (born Chieti, 7 March 1942) is an Italian actor, screenwriter, and film and television director.

Filmography

Actor
 Uccideva a freddo, directed by Guido Celano (1966)
 Il seme dell'uomo, directed by Marco Ferreri (1969)

Screenwriter

Film
 L'educatore autorizzato, directed by Luciano Odorisio (1980)
 Sciopèn, directed by Luciano Odorisio (1982)
 Il momento magico, directed by Luciano Odorisio (1984)
 La monaca di Monza, directed by Luciano Odorisio (1987)
 Via Paradiso, directed by Luciano Odorisio (1988)
 Ne parliamo lunedì, directed by Luciano Odorisio (1990)

Television
 Mio figlio, directed by Luciano Odorisio (2005)
 Io e mio figlio - Nuove storie per il commissario Vivaldi, directed by Luciano Odorisio (2010)

Director

Film
 L'educatore autorizzato (1980)
 Sciopèn (1982)
 Dear Maestro (1983)
 Il momento magico (1984)
 La monaca di Monza (1987)
 Via Paradiso (1988)
 Ne parliamo lunedì (1990)
 Una famiglia in giallo (1991)
 Senza movente (1999)
 Guardiani delle nuvole (2004)

Television
 Mio figlio (2005)
 Il sangue e la rosa (2008)
 Io non dimentico (2008)
 Io e mio figlio - Nuove storie per il commissario Vivaldi (2010)

References

External links

Italian film directors
Italian male film actors
Italian screenwriters
Italian male screenwriters
Italian television directors
People from Chieti
1942 births
Living people